Bart Schultz (born August 9, 1951) is an American philosopher who is Senior Lecturer in Humanities (Philosophy) and Director of the Civic Knowledge Project at the University of Chicago.

Career
Schultz has taught in the College at the University of Chicago since October 1, 1987, having designed a wide range of core courses as well as courses on Teaching Precollegiate Philosophy, Consequentialism from Bentham to Singer, Philosophy and Public Education, The Philosophy of Poverty, John Dewey, The Chicago School of Philosophy, Political Philosophy, Philosophy of Education, Philosophies of Environmentalism and Sustainability, and Philosophy of Happiness.

He has published widely in Philosophy. He is a contributing editor to Essays on Henry Sidgwick (Cambridge, 1992), Utilitarianism and Empire (Lexington, 2005), with G. Varouxakis, Proceedings of the World Congress--University of Catania on H. Sidgwick: Happiness and Religion (Catania: Universita degli Studi di Catania, 2007), with P. Bucolo and R. Crisp, Proceedings of the World Congress--University of Catania on H. Sidgwick II: Ethics, Psychics, and Politics (Catania: Universita degli Studi di Catania, 2011), with P. Bucolo and R. Crisp, and various journal symposia, including the Book Symposium on Katarzyna de Lazari-Radek and Peter Singer, The Point of View of the Universe: Sidgwick and Contemporary Ethics (Etica & Politica, Vol. XVIII, No. 1 (Trieste: University of Trieste, April 2016)), with original contributions by Roger Crisp, Brad Hooker, Derek Parfit, and Mariko Nakano, and replies by Katarzyna de Lazari-Radek and Peter Singer. Schultz's major books are Henry Sidgwick, Eye of the Universe (Cambridge, 2004) and The Happiness Philosophers: The Lives and Works of the Great Utilitarians (Princeton, 2017). 

In 2004 Henry Sidgwick: Eye of the Universe won the American Philosophical Society's Jacques Barzun Prize in Cultural History.

He has also written and lectured on the philosophies of Barack Obama, Martin Luther King Jr., and Timuel D. Black, and on the politics of race.

Through the Civic Knowledge Project (CKP), Schultz has developed a number of public ethics/humanities programs to provide opportunities for University of Chicago students, staff, and faculty to get involved with the larger South Side community in Chicago. For a select history of his work with the CKP, see his "The New Chicago School of Philosophy" (Rounded Globe, November 15, 2015).  He developed the CKP's Winning Words precollegiate philosophy program, which won the 2012 American Philosophical Association's PDC Prize for Excellence and Innovation in Philosophy Programs. 
 In 2013, he was honored with the PUSH Excel Outstanding Educator Award by the Rainbow PUSH Coalition. 

Schultz is on the Editorial Board of Utilitas, the leading professional journal of utilitarian studies, and on the Board of Directors of PLATO (Philosophy Learning and Teaching Organization), the main professional group in the U.S. devoted to precollegiate philosophy. 

He is currently developing, with such organizations as the Rainbow PUSH Coalition, an extensive program called the Dr. Martin Luther King Jr. Initiative, which will commemorate the work of Dr. King on the  50th anniversary of his tragic assassination.  

Schultz’s philosophical orientation is complex, highly interdisciplinary, and difficult to describe.  He has been deeply influenced by such figures as John Rawls, J.B. Schneewind, Martha Nussbaum, Alan Donagan, Richard Rorty, Derek Parfit, Amartya Sen, Peter Singer, Angela Davis, Noam Chomsky, Michelle Alexander, Edward Said, Roger Crisp, Dale Jamieson, Elizabeth S. Anderson, Danielle Allen and Timuel D. Black.  Best known for his work on the 19th-century philosopher Henry Sidgwick, Schultz aims to expand the range of interpretive questions philosophers should consider; his work on the history of philosophy seeks both a deeper historical/critical understanding through the examination of both the lives and the works of such philosophers as Sidgwick, and a candid confrontation with the racism, sexism, and patterns of exclusion that have characterized philosophy both past and present.  He claims that this type of historical approach can help unmask the limitations of some popular current forms of academic philosophy.  His blog post "On Not Seeing in Philosophy" (September 29, 2016) is suggestive of the critical perspective characteristic of his work  Partly for such reasons, and because of his work in environmental philosophy, he has over the last three decades moved steadily away from the more Rawlsian and neo-Kantian frameworks that he was initially drawn to, in the direction of certain forms of consequentialism more characteristic of a Sidgwickian perspective, but with a greater emphasis on environmental issues and matters of diversity and inclusion.

Books
 Henry Sidgwick, Eye of the Universe, Cambridge University Press, 2004
 The Happiness Philosophers: The Lives and Works of the Great Utilitarians, Princeton University Press, 2017

See also
  Utilitarianism

References

1951 births
Living people
21st-century American philosophers
Analytic philosophers
American atheists
Atheist philosophers
Utilitarians
Consequentialists
University of Chicago faculty